A Man for All Islands: A Biography of Maumoon Abdul Gayoom is a biography about the second president of the second republic of the Maldives Maumoon Abdul Gayoom. It was written by Royston Ellis. 

Politics of the Maldives
Political books  
Books about the Maldives